Thomas Barnard ( 1726–1806) was an Irish Anglican bishop.

Thomas Barnard may also refer to:

Thomas Barnard (MP) (1830–1909), Whig Member of Parliament for Bedford
Tom Barnard (born 1951), American radio host

See also
Thomas Barnard Flint (1847–1919), Canadian lawyer and politician